Billberg is a Swedish surname. Notable people with the surname include:

 Gustaf Johan Billberg (1772–1844), Swedish botanist and entomologist
 Rolf Billberg (1930–1966), Swedish alto saxophonist

Swedish-language surnames